Akizuki-class destroyer may refer to:

 , the "Type B Destroyer" used by the Imperial Japanese Navy during World War II
 , a developed version of the 1942 class
 , a Cold War era destroyer used by the Japanese Maritime Self-Defense Force for anti-submarine warfare.
 , a class of escort destroyers of the Japanese Maritime Self-Defense Force

Destroyer classes